Hans-Heinz Augenstein (11 July 1921 – 7 December 1944) was a German Luftwaffe military aviator and flying ace during World War II. A flying ace or fighter ace is a military aviator credited with shooting down five or more enemy aircraft during aerial combat. Operating as a night fighter pilot, he was credited with 46 aerial victories, of which 45 were four-engine bombers, all of which claimed in Defense of the Reich.

Born in Pforzheim-Brötzingen, Augenstein grew up in the Weimar Republic and Nazi Germany. He joined the military service in the Luftwaffe and was trained as a night fighter pilot. Following flight training, he was posted to Nachtjagdgeschwader 1 (NJG 1—1st Fighter Wing) in 1942. Flying with this wing, Augenstein claimed his first aerial victory on 13/14 May 1943 over a Royal Air Force bomber aircraft. In March 1944, he was appointed squadron leader of 12. Staffel (12th squadron) of NJG 1 and was awarded the Knight's Cross of the Iron Cross on 9 June 1944 for 35 nocturnal aerial victories claimed. On 7 December 1944, Augenstein was killed in action when he was shot down by a RAF night fighter near Münster.

Early life
Augenstein was born on 11 July 1921 in Pforzheim-Brötzingen, at the time in the Republic of Baden of the Weimar Republic.

World War II
World War II in Europe began on Friday, 1 September 1939, when German forces invaded Poland. Following the 1939 aerial Battle of the Heligoland Bight, Royal Air Force (RAF) attacks shifted to the cover of darkness, initiating the Defence of the Reich campaign. By mid-1940, Generalmajor (Brigadier General) Josef Kammhuber had established a night air defense system dubbed the Kammhuber Line. It consisted of a series of control sectors equipped with radars and searchlights and an associated night fighter. Each sector named a Himmelbett (canopy bed) would direct the night fighter into visual range with target bombers. In 1941, the Luftwaffe started equipping night fighters with airborne radar such as the Lichtenstein radar. This airborne radar did not come into general use until early 1942.

Night fighter career

Augenstein first served with 3. Staffel (3rd squadron) of Nachtjagdgeschwader 1 (NJG 1—1st Fighter Wing) during mid 1942. In late 1942, Augenstein transferred to 7. Staffel. This squadron was part of III. Gruppe (3rd group) of NJG 1 and at the time commanded by Hauptmann Wolfgang Thimmig.

Bomber Command sent 518 bombers on a mission to bomb Essen on the night of 27/28 May, 23 bombers did not return to England. Augenstein was credited with four aerial victories that night, including three Halifax and a Vickers Wellington bomber. The Wellington was HE752 from No. 166 Squadron which crashed near Hengelo. On 11/12 June, Bomber Command attacked Düsseldorf with 890 bombers. The following night, Bomber Command lost 24 bombers in an attack on Bochum. Augenstein was credited with the destruction of two Halifax bombers that night. Augenstein was awarded the German Cross in Gold on 16 January 1944.

Squadron leader and death
On 1 March 1944, Augenstein was made Staffelkapitän (squadron leader) of 12. Staffel of NJG 1 On the night of 27/28 May, Bomber Command attacked Leopoldsburg. Augenstein claimed three Halifax bombers shot down that night, taking his total to 40 aerial victories. A little less than two weeks later, on 9 June, he was awarded the Knight's Cross of the Iron Cross. Augenstein was shot down on the night of 15/16 June near Roubaix, possibly by Flight Lieutenant W. W. Provan from No. 29 Squadron.

On the night of 2/3 November, flying from an airfield at Dortmund, Augenstein claimed his last three aerial victories during a RAF raid on Düsseldorf. Augenstein and his Bordfunker Feldwebel Günther Steins were killed but his air gunner Unteroffizier Kurt Schmidt bailed out unhurt. Augenstein was credited with 46 victories, all recorded at night and including 45 four-engine bombers.

Summary of career

Aerial victory claims
Augenstein was credited with 46 victories, of which 45 were four-engine bombers. Foreman, Parry and Mathews, authors of Luftwaffe Night Fighter Claims 1939 – 1945, researched the German Federal Archives and found records for 45 nocturnal victory claims. Mathews and Foreman also published Luftwaffe Aces — Biographies and Victory Claims, listing Augenstein with 41 claims, plus five further unconfirmed claim.

Awards
 Honour Goblet of the Luftwaffe on 17 January 1944 as Leutnant and pilot
 German Cross in Gold on 16 January 1944 as Leutnant in the 7./Nachjagdgeschwader 1
 Knight's Cross of the Iron Cross on 9 June 1944 as Oberleutnant and Staffelführer of the 7./Nachjagdgeschwader 1

Notes

References

Citations

Bibliography

 
 
 
 
 
 
 
 
 
 
 
 
 
 
 

1921 births
1944 deaths
Luftwaffe pilots
German World War II flying aces
Luftwaffe personnel killed in World War II
Recipients of the Gold German Cross
Recipients of the Knight's Cross of the Iron Cross
Aviators killed by being shot down
Military personnel from Pforzheim